Louis Sauveur, Marquis de Villeneuve was French ambassador to the Ottoman Empire from 1728 to 1741. He was instrumental in pushing the Ottoman Empire to war with the Russian Empire, in the Russo-Turkish War (1735–1739). He was also put in charge of negotiating the peace to this war, managing to impose unfavourable conditions on the Austrians, as a result, the 1739 Peace of Belgrade was extremely favourable to the Ottomans, thanks to Villeneuve's intervention.

See also
 Franco-Ottoman alliance
 Princess Hatice
 Capture of Belgrade (1739)

Notes

Ambassadors of France to the Ottoman Empire
18th-century French diplomats